Savi Savi Nenapu is a 2007 Indian Kannada film starring actor Prem and Mallika Kapoor. The title of the film is based on a song from My Autograph (2005).

Story
Prem (played by Prem Kumar) passionately loves his classmate Preethi (Mallika Kapoor) and they get married. But destiny turns cruel towards them and Preethi passes away. Preethi's heart is transplanted to Pallavi (Tejaswini) who is also facing marital problems, as her husband is very career bound as a Model and is not able to keep Pallavi Happy. There is also a co-incidence that Pallavi's husband is identical to Prem. Prem does not want Preethi's heart to suffer and plans things in such a way that Pallavi remains happy. He impersonates himself as Pallavi's husband and spends quality time with her - which she is expecting very badly.

There comes a point when Pallavi's heart fails to adjust after transplantation and she has to be operated. Then Prem reveals about his impersonation to Pallavi's husband and he understands that all was done to keep Pallavi happy. He promises Prem that from now onwards he shall take good care of Pallavi, and try to keep her happy in life.

R P Patnaik devised the music for this movie, including the title track titled "Saviyo Saviyo", rendered by Sonu Nigam and  Shreya Ghoshal and written by Nagatihalli Chandrashekar.

Cast
Prem Kumar as Prem and Raj 
Mallika Kapoor as Preethi
Tejaswini Prakash as Pallavi
Srinath
Tulasi Shivamani

Soundtrack

Reception 
A critic from The Times of India wrote that "Slow pace of narration, unnecessary flashbacks and a dull script have marred the film". A critic from Rediff.com opined that "The question is, is a sensitive story enough to make a film interesting? The answer is a big no. The film is a yawn".

References

External links
 

2007 films
2000s Kannada-language films